ILTEX Lykoi was a football club based in Kalochori, Thessaloniki, Greece. The team was owned by the Greek businessman Kostas Iliadis.

Iliadis was the owner of a group of companies that consisted of Iltex Lykoi, Knitting Mills of Pieria, Iltex S.A, Dyeing Industry of Sindos S.A, Dyeing Industry of Kilkis S.A, Iltex Construction company S.A, with a total turnover of 70 million Euro and 900 people staff.
Iliadis group of companies was the most important textile company in Greece for more than a decade (1990–2003).
In 2004 the problems of reduced demand, inadequate financing from banks to textile industry, forced Iliadis to bankruptcy and the football club merged with the team Anagennisi Epanomi. The most important highlight in the team's history was the participation in Greek Second division in the late 1990s. On Sunday August 9, 2009, Iliadis and his friend Emmanouil Tsakiropoulos (also a former agent of the amateur team Anagennisi Terpsitheas) were killed in a car accident that took place on the Thessaloniki-Katerini, national highway, near the bridge of the river Loudias. He was 59 years old.

Naming
ILTEX company was the team's sponsor. It stand for Iliadis Textile and was the company owned by the club's president. Lykoi means Wolves in Greek.

Stadium Stelios Iliadis

Kostas Iliadis had pioneering ideas. Among others he had hired nutrition experts for the player's diet, who later published their experiences at the club.
The biggest contribution was the construction of a modern Football Ground in Kalohori. It was launched in October 1996 and in its final form had a capacity of 8369 seated spectators, had roofed stands, grass, lights and modern training facilities, comparable to those of teams of 1st National.

Badge
The club's badge featured a wolf head in black color.
The Club Badge

References

Association football clubs established in 1982
Sport in Thessaloniki
Football clubs in Central Macedonia
Defunct football clubs in Greece
1982 establishments in Greece
2004 disestablishments in Greece